MapQuest (stylized as mapquest) is an American free online web mapping service. It was launched in 1996 as the first commercial web mapping service. MapQuest vies for market share with competitors such as Google Maps and Here.

History

MapQuest's origins date to 1967 with the founding of Cartographic Services, a division of R.R. Donnelley & Sons in Chicago, which moved to Lancaster, Pennsylvania, in 1969. In the mid-1980s, R.R. Donnelley & Sons began generating maps and routes for customers, with cooperation by Barry Glick, a University at Buffalo Ph.D. In 1994 it was spun off as GeoSystems Global Corporation. Much of the code was adapted for use on the Internet to create the MapQuest web service in 1996. MapQuest's original services were mapping (referred to as "Interactive Atlas") and driving directions (called "TripQuest").

Sensing the emerging demand for spatial applications on the Internet, and with crippling network latency in Lancaster, the executive team of Barry Glick and Perry Evans moved MapQuest to the up-and-coming LoDo area of Denver, Colorado.

The initial Denver team consisted of Evans, Simon Greenman, Chris Fanjoy and Harry Grout. To make MapQuest a serious contender in the online spatial application market, a robust set of geographical tools was developed under Greenman's direction. Grout, who had spent time at Rand McNally, Etak and Navigation Technologies Corporation building digital map data, was tasked with acquiring data and licensing arrangements. The initial team experienced rapid growth in the Denver office, and in a short time MapQuest was becoming a well-known brand.

On 25 February 1999, MapQuest went public, trading on Nasdaq. In December 1999, America Online (AOL) announced it would acquire MapQuest for $1.1 billion. The deal closed in 2000. Chief Operating Officer / Chief Financial Officer Jim Thomas managed these transactions.

For a period, MapQuest included satellite images through a licensing deal with GlobeXplorer, but later removed them because of the unorthodox business mechanics of the arrangement brokered by AOL. In September 2006, the website once again began serving satellite imagery in a new beta program.

In 2004, MapQuest, uLocate, Research in Motion and Nextel launched MapQuest Find Me, a buddy-finder service that worked on GPS-enabled mobile phones. MapQuest Find Me let users automatically find their location, access maps and directions and locate nearby points of interest, including airports, hotels, restaurants, banks and ATMs. Users also had the ability to set up alerts to be notified when network members arrive at or depart from a designated area. In 2005 the service became available on Sprint, and in 2006, Boost Mobile.

In July 2006, MapQuest created a beta version of a new feature with which users could build customized routes by adding additional stops, reordering stops along the way and avoiding any undesired turns or roads. Users could also write out the starting address.

In April 2007, MapQuest announced a partnership with General Motors' OnStar to allow OnStar subscribers to plan their driving routes on MapQuest.com and send their destination to OnStar's turn-by-turn navigation service. The OnStar Web Destination Entry pilot program began in the summer of 2007 with a select group of OnStar subscribers.

Around 2008, the general public made a significant shift away from MapQuest to the much younger Google Maps service.

In July 2010, MapQuest announced plans to become the first major mapping site to embrace open-source mapping data, launching a new site separate from its main site, entirely using data from the OpenStreetMap project. On July 14, 2010, MapQuest launched a simplified user interface and made the site more compact. MapQuest also introduced "My Maps" personalization, which enables the user to personalize the interface.

In July 2012, Brian McMahon became the CEO and GM of MapQuest.

In May 2015, with the purchase of AOL by Verizon Communications, MapQuest came under the ownership of Verizon.

On 11 July 2016, MapQuest discontinued its open tile API, and users such as GNOME Maps were switched to a temporarily free tier of the Mapbox tileserver, while considering alternatives.

In 2019, Verizon Media sold Mapquest to System1.

Services and programs
Currently, MapQuest uses some of TomTom's services for its mapping system.

MapQuest provides some extent of street-level detail or driving directions for a variety of countries. Users can check if their country is available using a dropdown menu on the MapQuest home page.

The company offers a free mobile app for Android and iOS that features POI search, voice-guided navigation, real-time traffic and other features. MapQuest also offers a mobile-friendly website.

MapQuest has several travel products and also includes a feature to let users compare nearby gas prices, similar to the service offered by GasBuddy.com. However, this feature is only available in the United States.

MapQuest's POI data helps the service differentiate itself from other wayfinding software by guiding users directly to the entrances of businesses and destinations, rather than to general street addresses.

Publishing
In October 2006, MapQuest sold its publishing division (which published traditional maps in paper format) to concentrate on its online and mobile services.

See also
 List of online map services
 Comparison of web map services
 Digital mapping

References

External links
 
 MapQuest – OpenStreetMap Wiki

1967 establishments in Illinois
2019 mergers and acquisitions
American travel websites
Companies based in Denver
Companies based in Lancaster, Pennsylvania
Internet properties established in 1996
Map companies of the United States
Transport companies established in 1967
Web Map Services
Web mapping